Born Ella Dorsner, to Charles and Evalina Dorsner, Ella Wesner (May 29, 1841 in Pennsylvania – November 10, 1917 in Brooklyn, New York) was the most celebrated male impersonator of the Gilded Age Vaudeville circuit. Wesner began her career at the age of nine as part of a family of vaudeville and musical-stage dancers.  By her mid-twenties, she was playing both male and female roles, at some point meeting and working as a "dresser" for the most notorious, and perhaps the earliest Vaudeville male impersonator of the time, Annie Hindle.

Wesner's career was closely linked to the vaudeville impresario Tony Pastor, for whom she was the featured male impersonator, performing at Pastor's theater and touring in traveling shows he organized.

Wesner's career was briefly derailed in 1873 when she abruptly left Pastor's shows to elope to Paris with the notorious Helen Josephine "Josie" Mansfield, who had been the mistress of Gilded Age Robber Baron "Diamond Jubilee" Jim Fisk as well as the mistress of his murderer, Edward S. Stokes. The event evoked considerable scandal;  it was discussed in most of the major metropolitan newspapers and journals in New York, Chicago, and other major American cities. After the romance cooled, however, Wesner returned to the United States and resumed her career with Pastor, winning even wider audiences.  Her most celebrated era was the 1880s; her act included not only songs celebrating the "sporting" life and skits such as her popular rendition of a drunkard getting a barber's shave, but also monologues containing advice for men about how to court, treat and satisfy women. Wesner's career stumbled as styles changed; she shifted routines to become a "quick-change" artist, and then faded from vaudeville.

Wesner was laid to rest on November 14, 1917 in the Actors' Fund Plot, Prospect Hill in The Evergreens Cemetery, in Brooklyn, New York.

References

External links 

1841 births
1917 deaths
American drag kings
American LGBT entertainers